SMK Raja Lumu (or Raja Lumu Secondary School) is a secondary school in Port Klang, Selangor, Malaysia established in 1982.

History
The school's land was first planned to be the school for Simpang Lima Tamil Primary School. But because of the location, the school was closed and became Putera Sekolah Tengku Ampuan Rahimah. Then, the school has moved to a new location and here became the hostel for Putera Sekolah Tengku Ampuan Rahimah dan Pulau Lumut. After it was renovated for a few years, the Raja Lumu Secondary School was established.

On 1 January 1982, Mr. Mohammad Noribinin Taib was appointed to be the school's first principal and Mrs. S. Sthipam as the supervisor of this school.

This school holds 2 schooling sessions. The morning session is for Form 3, Form 4 and Form 5 (ages 15 to 17) while the afternoon session is for Peralihan or Reform students, Form 1 and Form 2 students (ages 13 to 14). This is done to accommodate the large number of students attending the school.

See also
 Education in Malaysia

References

Secondary schools in Malaysia
Schools in Selangor
Educational institutions established in 1982
1982 establishments in Malaysia